Frédéric Brillant (born 26 June 1985) is a French former footballer who is currently an assistant coach for D.C. United in Major League Soccer. He has played most of his career with clubs in Belgium and in the United States.

Career

Belgium 
Brillant started his professional career with RE Bertrix in the lower divisions of Belgium. He then joined second-division side KV Oostende in 2011. Brillant then made it to the top-flight Belgium league, Belgian First Division A by joining Beerschot AC in 2012. After his former club, KV Oostende was promoted to the first division, Brillant re-joined Oostende in 2013.

Brillant appeared in 127 games in total for K.V. Oostende and contributed 13 goals and one assist.

New York City FC
Brillant was acquired by New York City FC from the Belgian team KV Oostende on 28 January 2016 on a free transfer and scored his first MLS goal against Orlando City SC on 29 May 2016. He was released by New York at the end of their 2017 season.

D.C. United
He was signed to a two-year contract by D.C. United on 10 December 2017. On 1 November, 2018, Brillant scored his first goal for D.C. United against the Columbus Crew with a header in the first round of the MLS 2018 Playoffs. Brillant finished his first year for D.C. United with 27 games played, 24 starts, and a contribution of one assist. Brillant scored his second goal for D.C. United against the Seattle Sounders on 22 September, 2019. The goal was assisted by Wayne Rooney.

For his consistency with D.C., he was featured MLS's Team of the Week three weeks in a row in 2019.

On 10 December 2019, he signed a two-year contract extension with the club. In 2021, Brillant's playing time began to decline after the acquisition of Brendan Hines-Ike and the rise of Donovan Pines in the starting lineup. Following the 2021 season, Brillant was released by D.C. United.

On 11 January 2022, Brillant announced his retirement from playing and professional football, and would be taking up a role as assistant coach to Loudoun United.

Career statistics

Club

References

External links
 

1985 births
Living people
Association football defenders
Belgian Pro League players
Beerschot A.C. players
D.C. United players
K.V. Oostende players
French expatriate sportspeople in Belgium
French expatriate sportspeople in the United States
French footballers
Major League Soccer players
New York City FC players
Expatriate soccer players in the United States
Expatriate footballers in Belgium
Loudoun United FC
USL Championship coaches
People from Sedan, Ardennes
CS Sedan Ardennes players
French expatriate footballers
Sportspeople from Ardennes (department)
Footballers from Grand Est
D.C. United non-playing staff
Association football coaches